Veronica dabneyi, the Azores speedwell, is a flowering plant species of the family Plantaginaceae, endemic to the Azores. It is present only in the Western Group of islands (Corvo and Flores). It was thought to be extinct as it had not been observed since 1938, but was rediscovered in 1999, making it a Lazarus taxon.

References

dabneyi
Endemic flora of the Azores